Angadanan, officially the Municipality of Angadanan (or Angadanan Nuevo), is a 3rd class municipality in the province of Isabela, Philippines. At the 2020 census, it had a population of 44,977.

Geography

Barangays
Angadanan is politically subdivided into 59 barangays. These barangays are headed by elected officials: Barangay Captain, Barangay Council, whose members are called Barangay Councilors. All are elected every three years.

Climate

Demographics

Ethnic groups include the Ilokanos, Gaddang, Ibanags, Yogads and the Tagalogs.

Economy

Government

Local government
The municipality is governed by a mayor designated as its local chief executive and by a municipal council as its legislative body in accordance with the Local Government Code. The mayor, vice mayor, and the councilors are elected directly by the people through an election which is being held every three years.

Elected officials

Congress representation
Angadanan, belonging to the third legislative district of the province of Isabela, currently represented by Hon. Ian Paul L. Dy.

Education
The Schools Division of Isabela governs the town's public education system. The division office is a field office of the DepEd in Cagayan Valley region. The office governs the public and private elementary and public and private high schools throughout the municipality.

External links
Municipal Profile at the National Competitiveness Council of the Philippines
Angadanan at the Isabela Government Website
Municipality of Angadanan
Local Governance Performance Management System
[ Philippine Standard Geographic Code]
Philippine Census Information

References

Municipalities of Isabela (province)
Populated places on the Rio Grande de Cagayan